The 1897 Kentucky Derby was the 23rd running of the Kentucky Derby. The race took place on May 12, 1897.

Full results

Winning Breeder: John B. Ewing; (TN)

Payout
 The winner received a purse of $4,850.
 Second place received $700.
 Third place received $300.

References

1897
Kentucky Derby
Derby
May 1897 sports events
1897 in American sports